Mississippi Highway 18 (MS 18) is a state highway stretching across central Mississippi, from just a couple miles inland of the Mississippi River, through the state capital of Jackson, to the Alabama state line.

Route description

MS 18 begins in Claiborne County in Port Gibson at an intersection with US 61, just across the Little Bayou Pierre from downtown. It heads east as a two-lane highway through neighborhoods before leaving Port Gibson at an interchange with the Natchez Trace Parkway. The highway travels through somewhat hilly terrain for the next several miles, where it passes through Hermanville and Carlisle, before entering Copiah County. MS 18 travels through the northwestern corner of the county, where it passes through Carpenter, crosses Bayou Pierre, and passes by the Utica campus of Hinds Community College, before entering Hinds County.

MS 18 curves northeastward as it passes through the town of Utica, bypassing downtown along it southeast side as it has a concurrency (overlap) with MS 27. The highway travels through farmland for several miles, where it passes through Raymond (having a junction with MS 467 there) and widens to a four-lane divided highway, before entering the Jackson city limits and having an interchange with I-20 (Exit 40 A/B). MS 18 becomes concurrent with US 80 and they head east as a four-lane undivided highway through a business district to have an interchange with I-220/US 49 (Exit 1 A/B). US 80/MS 18 pass through a mix business districts and neighborhoods for a few miles as they travel just to the south of Jackson State University, while paralleling I-20/I-55 just to the north. The highway passes along the southern edge of downtown, where they have interchanges with West Street and US 51 (State Street), before crossing the Pearl River to leave both Jackson and Hinds County to enter Rankin County.

US 80/MS 18 immediately enter Pearl and widen to a divided highway as they pass under I-55 (without an interchange) and have an intersection with Old Highway 49 S before coming to an intersection between US 49 and MS 468 (Flowood Drive). MS 468 joins the concurrency and the highway passes a business district, where MS 468 splits off on Pearson Road, and US 80/MS 18 have an intersection with MS 475 (Airport Road) near Jackson–Medgar Wiley Evers International Airport before entering neighboring Brandon. The highway passes through some neighborhoods before entering a business district, where MS 18 splits off and heads south to have another interchange with I-20 (Exit 54) before narrowing to two-lanes. MS 18 bypasses downtown along its southern edge, passing through an extremely rural and wooded area for a few miles before passing through neighborhoods, where it has another intersection with MS 468 (Whitfield Road). The highway has an intersection with Louis Wilson Drive (Old MS 18) before leaving Brandon and traveling southeast through a mix of rural farmland and woodlands for the next several miles. MS 18 has an intersection with MS 43 before passing through Puckett, where it has an intersection with MS 13. The highway crosses a bridge over the Strong River to pass through Galilee, where it becomes concurrent with MS 541 before entering Smith County.

The highway passes through White Oak, where MS 541 splits off and heads north, and MS 18 travels east through woodlands (part of the Bienville National Forest) for several miles to enter Raleigh. MS 18 passes through neighborhoods and a business district before passing along the northern edge of downtown, where it has an intersection with MS 35. The highway now leaves Raleigh and travels through more woodlands to cross the Leaf River and have an intersection with MS 501 before passing through the village of Sylvarena. MS 18 now enters Jasper County.

MS 18 immediately enters Bay Springs at an junction with MS 531 and travels through some neighborhoods before passing through downtown, where it has an intersection with MS 15. It now leaves Bay Springs and heads northeast through a mix of farmland and wooded areas for several miles, where it has a short concurrency with MS 503, before passing through Rose Hill, where it has a junction with MS 513. The highway makes a sharp turn to the southeast for several miles to cross into Clarke County.

MS 18 travels through woodlands an interchange with I-59 (Exit 126) before straight through downtown Pachuta, where it has a concurrency with MS 512, as well as having an intersection with US 11. The highway leaves Pachuta and travels east through a mix of farmland and woodlands for several miles to become concurrent with MS 145 and they head north to cross the Chickasawhay River into Quitman. MS 18/MS 145 almost immediately enter downtown, with MS 18 splitting off at another junction with MS 512. MS 18 heads east through neighborhoods to cross over Archusa Creek Lake and have an intersection with MS 511 before coming to an interchange with US 45. MS 18 now leaves Quitman and travels east through remote, wooded, and hilly terrain for the next several miles (part of the North Central Hills portion of the Appalachian Mountains) to come to the Alabama state line, where MS 18 ends and the road continues into the state towards Butler as Choctaw County Road 20 (CR 20).

Major intersections

References

External links

Magnolia Meanderings

018
Transportation in Claiborne County, Mississippi
Transportation in Hinds County, Mississippi
Transportation in Rankin County, Mississippi
Transportation in Smith County, Mississippi
Transportation in Jasper County, Mississippi
Transportation in Clarke County, Mississippi